Phacelia platyloba is a species of phacelia known by the common name broadlobe phacelia. It is endemic to California, where it is known only from a section of the central Sierra Nevada foothills. It is a resident of chaparral, woodland, and other local habitat.

It is an annual herb producing a branched or unbranched erect stem up to 45 centimeters tall. It is coated in soft and stiff hairs. The leaves are up to 9 centimeters long and divided into several lobed to intricately toothed leaflets. The inflorescence is a one-sided curving or coiling cyme of widely bell-shaped flowers. Each flower is about half a centimeter long and pale blue or lavender in color. It is surrounded by a calyx of densely hairy sepals which are unequal in size and shape, 2 being longer and wider than the other 3.

External links
Jepson Manual Treatment
Photo gallery

platyloba
Endemic flora of California
Flora of the Sierra Nevada (United States)
Natural history of the California chaparral and woodlands
Flora without expected TNC conservation status